Prince Victor Albert Jay Duleep Singh (10 July 1866 – 7 June 1918) was the eldest son of Maharani Bamba Müller and Maharaja Sir Duleep Singh, the last Maharaja of Lahore, and of the Sikh Empire, and the grandson of Maharaja Ranjit Singh.

Biography
Victor Duleep Singh was educated at Eton and Trinity College, Cambridge, where he met Lady Anne Blanche Alice Coventry whom he would later marry. In 1887 he entered the Royal Military College, Sandhurst, with a special Cadetship and left it the following December to be commissioned as Lieutenant into the 1st (Royal) Dragoons. 

In 1889 Singh was stationed at Halifax, Nova Scotia, as a member of the staff of General Sir John Ross, commander of British forces in British North America. In December, he was rumoured to be engaged to marry Jeanne Turnure, daughter of Lawrence Turnure, a New York City banker, after staying at the Turnure house in Newport, Rhode Island, the previous summer; the rumour was however denied by the banker. In February the following year, Singh took a three-month leave of absence from the army to meet his father in Paris, when rumours of unpaid creditors in Halifax became current for the first time. He continued to serve in the Royal Dragoons until he resigned his commission in 1898.

On the death of his father, Maharaja Sir Duleep Singh, on 23 October 1893, Victor succeeded him as Head of the Royal House of the Punjab.

On 4 January 1898, Prince Victor Albert Jay Duleep Singh married Lady Anne Coventry, a daughter of the 9th Earl of Coventry, who was eight years younger than himself. The marriage created a sensation: it was the first time an Indian prince had married an English noblewoman, and the marriage was made possible primarily due to the intervention of the Prince of Wales (subsequently King Edward VII). The wedding took place at St Peter's Church, Eaton Square, London, where Queen Victoria was also represented. Although Queen Victoria gave the couple her blessing, she allegedly told Lady Anne to never have children with the Prince. The marriage remained childless.

Singh was declared bankrupt on 4 September 1902, with debts totaling £117,900 (approximately £ in today's value), despite his £8,250 annual allowance and his wife's income of £2,500. The bankruptcy was attributed to bad investments and to gambling, something that plagued him for the rest of his life.

He died, without legitimate issue, aged 51, on 7 June 1918, and was buried at the Anglican Cemetery above Monte Carlo. Beside him is the grave of his wife who died aged 82, on 2 July 1956.

Honours

National dynastic honours
 House of Punjab: Sovereign Knight Grand Cross of the Propitious Star of Punjab
  House of Punjab: Sovereign Knight Grand Cross of the Order of Ranjit Singh

National honours
 : Recipient of the King Edward VII Coronation Medal
 : Recipient of the King George V Coronation Medal

Ancestry

References

Further reading
 The Duleep Singh's: The Photograph Album of Queen Victoria's Maharajah, by Peter Bance. Sutton Publishing, .
 Soveriegn, Squire & Rebel: Maharajah Duleep Singh and the Heirs of a Lost Kingdom, by Peter Bance. Coronet House Publishing,
   Letters to Prince Victor Duleep Singh as a schoolboy from his parents and others. Also copies of Prince Victor's letters of 1897 to Queen Victoria and the Secretary of State for India on the subject of his engagement to Lady Anne Coventry.

External links

 The Official Biography of Prince Victor Duleep Singh
 Genealogy of Lahore (Princely State) Queensland University

1866 births
1918 deaths
1st The Royal Dragoons officers
Alumni of Trinity College, Cambridge
Graduates of the Royal Military College, Sandhurst
People educated at Eton College
Sikh Empire
English Sikhs
20th-century Indian royalty
English people of Indian descent
English people of German descent
Indian people of German descent